Tuba, also Bidayat (Bideyat), is a dialect of the Zaghawa language found in Chad and western Sudan.  In contrast to their Zaghawa kin, Bidayat speakers are more nomadic.  This difference led early ethnographers to refer to them as different groups until linguistic similarities proved their close relationship.

The former President of Chad, Idriss Déby belonged to this group.

Notes and references 

Ethnic groups in Chad
Ethnic groups in Sudan
Saharan languages